Mustansar Hassan (born 1 June 1965) is a cricketer who plays for the Kuwait national cricket team. He played in the 2006 ACC Trophy tournament as the Captain of Kuwait Team. He has also played various International Tournaments all around Asia.

References

1965 births
Living people
Kuwaiti cricketers
Pakistani expatriates in Kuwait
Place of birth missing (living people)